Acrocercops triacris is a moth of the family Gracillariidae. It is known from Sri Lanka.

References

triacris
Moths of Asia
Moths described in 1908